Tige Arthur Simmons, OAM (born 5 May 1977) is an Australian wheelchair basketball player who represented Australia in the 2008, 2012 and 2016 Paralympic Games.

Biography 
Tige Simmons became a paraplegic due to a motorbike accident. He was part of the gold medal-winning Australian men's national wheelchair basketball team at the 2008 Summer Paralympics, for which he received a Medal of the Order of Australia.

He was a member of the Australian Men's National Wheelchair Basketball team that competed at the 2010 Wheelchair Basketball World Championship that won a gold medal. 
  
He plays as a guard and is classified as a 1.0 player.

In 2010, he was playing club basketball with the Brisbane Spinning Bullets.

At the 2012 Summer Paralympics he was part of the Australian men's wheelchair team that won silver. In 2016, he was selected for the 2016 Summer Paralympics in Rio de Janeiro where his team, The Rollers, finished sixth.

References

External links

Basketball Australia Profile

Paralympic gold medalists for Australia
Paralympic silver medalists for Australia
Wheelchair category Paralympic competitors
People with paraplegia
Wheelchair basketball players at the 2008 Summer Paralympics
Wheelchair basketball players at the 2012 Summer Paralympics
Paralympic wheelchair basketball players of Australia
Recipients of the Medal of the Order of Australia
1977 births
Living people
Medalists at the 2008 Summer Paralympics
Medalists at the 2012 Summer Paralympics
Wheelchair basketball players at the 2016 Summer Paralympics
Paralympic medalists in wheelchair basketball